Reenu Mathews is an Indian actress who has acted in Malayalam films. She works as a cabin crew member for Emirates (airline) in Dubai. She made her debut in Immanuel opposite super star Mammootty, directed by Laljose. She has acted with Mohanlal in Ennum Eppozhum, directed by Sathyan Anthikad & with Prithviraj in Sapthamasree Thaskaraha. She has paired with Mammooty again in Praise the Lord.

Personal life
Reenu is the youngest daughter of Mathews and Santhamma at Kottayam. She has an elder brother Ginu.

Career
Reenu Mathews' debut was with Mammooty in a 2013 Malayalam film Immanuel in which she played the role of Annie, a middle-class wife. Next she was seen in 5 Sundarikal directed by Amal Neerad. She again paired with Mammooty in a 2014 film Praise the Lord. Her next release was Anil Radhakrishna Menon's Sapthamashree Thaskaraha. and then  Amal Neerad's Iyobinte Pustakam. Her latest release was Sathyan Anthikad's  Ennum Eppozhum. She was last seen in Lord Livingstone 7000 Kandi directed by Anil Radhakrishnamenon. She has been working as a cabin crew in Emirates airlines.

Filmography

Short films

References

External links
 
 

Year of birth missing (living people)
Living people
Actresses from Kottayam
People from Dubai
Indian expatriates in the United Arab Emirates
Actresses in Malayalam cinema
Indian film actresses
21st-century Indian actresses